Reno is a city located in Parker County, Texas, United States (a small portion of the city extends into Tarrant County). As of the 2010 census, the city had a total population of 2,494.

Geography

Reno is located at 32°56'28" North, 97°35'0" West (32.940989, –97.583342).

Demographics

2020 census

As of the 2020 United States census, there were 2,878 people, 1,052 households, and 729 families residing in the city.

2000 census
As of the census of 2000, there were 2,441 people, 851 households, and 675 families residing in the city. The population density was 193.0 people per square mile (74.5/km). There were 943 housing units at an average density of 74.5 per square mile (28.8/km). The racial makeup of the city was 94.72% White, 0.37% African American, 0.94% Native American, 0.12% Asian, 0.00% Pacific Islander, 2.29% from other races, and 1.56% from two or more races. 5.61% of the population were Hispanic or Latino of any race.

There were 851 households, out of which 39.5% had children under the age of 18 living with them, 62.6% were married couples living together, 12.3% had a female householder with no husband present, and 20.6% were non-families. 15.6% of all households were made up of individuals, and 5.2% had someone living alone who was 65 years of age or older. The average household size was 2.87 and the average family size was 3.16.

In the city, the population was spread out, with 29.2% under the age of 18, 8.0% from 18 to 24, 31.6% from 25 to 44, 22.2% from 45 to 64, and 8.9% who were 65 years of age or older. The median age was 35 years. For every 100 females, there were 100.2 males. For every 100 females age 18 and over, there were 96.8 males.

The median income for a household in the city was $41,179, and the median income for a family was $45,764. Males had a median income of $37,356 versus $25,000 for females. The per capita income for the city was $17,557. 10.7% of the population and 10.3% of families were below the poverty line. 13.1% of those under the age of 18 and 15.9% of those 65 and older were living below the poverty line.

Education
Reno is served by the Azle and Springtown Independent School Districts.

References

External links
 City of Reno official website

Cities in Parker County, Texas
Cities in Texas
Dallas–Fort Worth metroplex
Cities in Tarrant County, Texas